Polstead is a village and civil parish in the Babergh district of Suffolk, England. It is situated on a small tributary stream of the River Stour.

History
The name Polstead is derived from "Place by a pool" There are still two large ponds in the village.

The village is noted for being the site of the Red Barn Murder in 1827. The victim Maria Marten, once found, was re-buried in the churchyard of St Mary's Church, but her gravestone was eventually chipped away to nothing by souvenir hunters. Only a sign on a shed wall now marks the approximate place where it stood, although her name is given to Marten's Lane which adjoins Water Lane and Mill Street.

The church, situated at the bottom of Polstead Hill, close to Polstead Pond, dates from the 12th century and contains some of what may be the earliest bricks made in England. The tower, which is 14th-century, is the only one in Suffolk which still has its original spire, although Pevsner says the spire is later than the tower. The tower at one time contained six bells. The interior of the church contains two brasses, one of which is of a priest and bears a date of 1460.

Next to the churchyard is Polstead Hall, rebuilt in the Georgian style in about 1819. In the grounds of the hall are the remains of the "Gospel Oak", which finally collapsed in 1953, but which is believed to have been the tree under which Saint Cedd preached to the heathen Anglo-Saxons. A small oak tree now grows next to the place it once stood.

Features
The main village is situated around Polstead Green and the Hill, although Polstead also comprises several hamlets including Polstead Heath, Hadleigh Heath, Bower House Tye, Bell's Corner, Mill Street and Whitestreet Green.

The village has one remaining pub, the 17th century Cock Inn, a community shop and post office and a playing field. The playing field, known locally as the pitch, hosts an annual music festival around the summer solstice called "Polstice", with local punk, folk and rock bands playing. In the 19th century a fair, lasting for two days, was held on Polstead Green on the Wednesday following 16 July.

Polstead is famous for its cherries and lends its name to a variety, the Polstead Black. In recent years more Polstead Black cherry trees have been planted in and around the village, as these trees had declined in numbers.

Bower House Tye
Bower House Tye is a hamlet near the A1071 road within the parish. There are five Listed buildings:  Bower House, Brewery Farmhouse, Holly Cottage, Holmwood Cottages 1 and 2 en The Bower Close.

Hadleigh Heath
A Baptist chapel was erected in Hadleigh Heath in 1801 and was removed to Polstead in 1849.

Polstead Heath 
A primitive Methodist chapel was erected in Polstead Heath in 1838.

Notable residents

 Sir (Frank) Patrick Bishop (1900–1972), advertising copywriter, barrister, businessman and Conservative Party politician
 Eric Buckley (1868–1948), Archdeacon of Sudbury, the first Archdeacon of Ipswich and Rector of Polstead from 1921 to 1945
 Air Chief Marshal Sir Gareth Clayton (1914–1992) senior Royal Air Force officer who served as Air Secretary from 1970 to 1972
 Percy Edwards (1908–1996), animal impersonator, ornithologist and entertainer
 Simon Gales (born 1964), contemporary artist
 R. P. Keigwin (1883–1972), academic and cricketer
 Ruth Rendell, Baroness Rendell of Babergh, CBE (1930-2015), author of thrillers and psychological murder mysteries

See also
 Polstead Road, Oxford, England

References

External links
 Polstead website

 
Villages in Suffolk
Civil parishes in Suffolk
Babergh District